The 2020 FIL European Luge Championships were held from 18 to 19 January 2020 in Lillehammer, Norway.

Schedule
Four events were held.

Medal summary

Medal table

Medalists

References

 
FIL European Luge Championships
European Championships
2020 in Norwegian sport
International sports competitions hosted by Norway
Sport in Lillehammer
FIL European Luge Championships
Luge in Norway
Luge